Cully may refer to:

Places
Cully, Calvados, a former commune in the Allier department, France
Cully, Switzerland, a municipality in the canton of Vaud
Cully, Portland, Oregon, United States, a neighborhood in northeast Portland

People

Given name or nickname

 Cully Dahlstrom (1912–1998), American ice hockey player
 Cully Hamner (born 1969), American comic book artist and writer
 Cully Lidberg (1900–1987), American football player 
 Cully Richards (1908–1978), American singer and actor
 Cully Simon (1918–1980), Canadian ice hockey player
 Cully Wilson (1892–1962), Canadian ice hockey player

Surname

 Barbara Cully (born 1955), American poet
 Zara Cully (1892–1978), American actress

Characters
 Cully Wilson (Lassie), on the TV show Lassie
 Cully Barnaby, on the show Midsomer Murders

See also
 Culley (disambiguation)
 McCully, mostly a surname

Lists of people by nickname